Schutter may refer to two rivers in Germany:

Schutter (Kinzig), tributary of the Kinzig, Baden Württemberg
Schutter (Danube), tributary of the Danube, Bavaria